A banana boat (or water sled), is an unpowered, inflatable recreational boat meant to be towed. Different models usually accommodate three to ten riders sitting on a larger, main tube and resting their feet on two laterally flanking tubes which stabilize the boat. The main tube is often yellow and banana-shaped. Some models have two main tubes.

See also
List of boat types

References

Boat types